{{Infobox person
| name               = Sathyan Sooryan ISC
| image              = Sathyan Sooryan - Master.jpg
| nationality        = Indian
| occupation         = Cinematographer
| notable_works      = Yuddham Sei, Theeran Adhigaaram Ondru, Kaithi, Master, Sulthan
| spouse             = Hamsa
| yearsactive        = 2011present
}}
Sathyan Sooryan ISC is an Indian cinematographer who predominantly works in the Tamil cinema. He is an alumnus of the College of Fine Arts, Chennai.

 Career 
Sooryan was also an assistant to P. C. Sreeram. He debuted with the movie Yuddham Sei (2011). In a review of the film by The Hindu, a critic noted that "Cinematographer Sathya's contribution is crucial — his lens and lighting accentuate the suspense and eeriness of the drama". His work in the movie Maya was critically acclaimed.
Cinematography in the film Theeran Adhigaaram Ondru was lauded by critics. In a review of the film by The Times of India, the reviewer wrote that "cinematographer Sathyan Sooryan’s wide frames, which turn the sun-burnt, unforgiving terrain into a parallel antagonist, make it a film that needs to be savoured on the big screen". In 2019, he worked for the film Kaithi. His work in the film was well appreciated. He made his Telugu debut with the biographical film Yatra''.

Filmography

References

External links
 

Living people
Tamil film cinematographers
Malayalam film cinematographers
Telugu film cinematographers
Cinematographers from Tamil Nadu
Year of birth missing (living people)